Strigatella fulvescens, the tawny mitre, is a species of sea snail, a marine gastropod mollusk in the family Mitridae, the miters or miter snails.

Description
The shell size varies between 20 mm and 50 mm.

Distribution
This species is distributed in the Indian Ocean along the Mascarene Basin and in the Western Pacific along Japan.

References

 Cernohorsky W. O. (1976). The Mitrinae of the World. Indo-Pacific Mollusca 3(17) page(s): 431
 Drivas, J. & M. Jay (1988). Coquillages de La Réunion et de l'île Maurice

Mitridae
Gastropods described in 1836
Taxa named by William Broderip